The Red King is a supervillain appearing in American comic books published by DC Comics. He first appeared in JLA Secret Files 2004 #1 (November 2004), and was created by Dan Slott and Dan Jurgens.

Publication history
The Red King's first historical appearance was in JLA Secret Files 2004 #1 (November 2004), set up to tie into an arc in the main JLA book. But the 4th Parallel arc in which he is introduced was shelved for three years until JLA Classified #32-36 which were published bi-weekly in January, February and March 2007.

Fictional character biography
Darrin Profitt just happened to be one of six billion innocent bystanders in the dreamscape during a battle between the Justice League and Doctor Destiny. After the defeat of Doctor Destiny on the dreamplane, the Materioptikon gem on his chest sucks him inside and falls at the feet of Darrin Profitt's dreamself. Doctor Destiny's physical body is rendered catatonic and the Justice League wake up, the Martian Manhunter turns Destiny's body over to the custody of Arkham Asylum. Darrin Profitt discovers that the gem is in his possession, and is accidentally sucked inside the artifact where he meets Doctor Destiny's trapped consciousness.

According to Doctor Destiny, the Materioptikon has the ability to reshape reality, but it is flawed, anyone who enters the gem automatically generates multiple physical copies from multiple possible universes, splitting that person up among these universes. Also according to him space and time was never meant to do this, using the gem in this fashion threatens the spacetime continuum. Destiny created special tools that re-integrate his own multiples and those of anyone else who enters the gem. In order to return to the real world without damaging reality, and generating any more dangerous alternate universes, Destiny stated that he had to repair all six billion flaws in the gem. Every time he repaired a flaw, he destroyed one of many possible universes and in all of them his body remained catatonic and dreaming in Arkham Asylum. Profitt overpowers Destiny and traps him in a facet of the gem, he then creates a few duplicates of himself using Doctor Destiny's tools and sends them out to place a bet at the race track and then invest that money in stocks, both the winners and losers return to the gem and report their results, he then uses the favorable results in his own reality. According to Doctor Destiny he endangered all of reality, all of Space and Time so that he could win a bet at the track.

Darrin uses the Parallels to create favorable outcomes by sending his duplicates into a Parallel to test for a specific outcome; if they fail, he deletes that Parallel, but if they succeed, he uses their solution. Darrin used the billions he'd made from manipulating the stock market via the Parallels to become a billionaire philanthropist and playboy.

Becoming the King
Due to boredom and in answer to a challenge posed by Doctor Destiny, he used the Parallels to acquire technology capable of defeating the Justice League and conquering the world. Under the guise of altruism his alternates prompt the scientists of their worlds to develop protocols for jamming JLA teleporters in case the Justice League Watchtower is compromised, telepathic shields, satellites for tracking metahumans, cutting edge weapons and armor to take down H.I.V.E. cells, strategies for defeating alien invaders, renegade Green Lanterns, rampaging Bizarros, and rogue speedsters, countermeasures against Themysciran magic in the event of an Amazon Attack, plans to construct and defuse theoretical doomsday devices, and ways to isolate, reproduce, and implant the metagene in ordinary humans. The parallel Red Kings share their knowledge and in the end the Darrin Profitts of the three final realities of the Materioptikon don their liquid metal Red King armor and set out to conquer their realities. According to Profitt his three-to-one chances for success are very good odds. Profitt secretly kept a fourth Parallel hidden from Doctor Destiny in the event that the three Red Kings failed, this fourth Parallel's Profitt wore a different costume and called himself Fallback. This Profitt had a world in which he never changed anything from his life, and lived in the same state as he was before Doctor Destiny's battle, serving as a "reset switch" that would allow Profitt to go back to his beginnings if something failed. He was executed by another Red King, who had no interest in becoming a loser again.

Third Parallel
In the Third Parallel, the Red King (3) uses one of his uncounted metahuman abilities to direct a swarm of meteors towards Earth. The unexpected kinetic bombardment wipes Keystone City and Central City off the map, killing the entire population of both cities along with Batman and Plastic Man. The Red King (3) injects Superman with a newly created Bizarro virus that rapidly mutates him taking away his intellect. He then taps into the JLA Satellite's teleporter and scatters the League around the planet. He hits Wally West with a beam that takes away his protective aura, so that the very act of running damages him faster than his healing factor can keep up with. He then kills Wonder Woman, crushes the Flash's chest, and smashes John Stewart. He then defeats an assembly of responding heroes including the Justice Society of America, Booster Gold and Doctor Fate, all of whom he refers to as "a collection of second stringers, benchwarmers and amateurs". He heads to Metropolis and calls out Superman, who can no longer think clearly due to the Bizarro virus. He is then blindsided by Batman, Flash, Green Lantern, and Wonder Woman in an attack co-ordinated by the Martian Manhunter who had faked their deaths, and assisted by Superman. Impatient and angry, the Red King (3) releases a massive blast wave which vaporizes all the remaining League members leaving only the Batman who was apparently the Martian Manhunter masquerading as the dead hero. The Red King (3) incinerates the Martian Manhunter, and then sits in the ruins of Metropolis until nightfall. According to his assistant, his blast wave destroyed every city on the planet and no one will ever trust him. The Red King (3) abandons that reality and then erases it from the Materioptikon.

Second Parallel

In the Second Parallel, the Red King (2) projects a hologram above the city of Metropolis demanding the unconditional surrender of all Earth's governments or else he will trigger a Doomsday device and destroy the planet. During the middle of his speech the device prematurely activates apparently killing him, and the hologram disappears. Superman and the League discover that they have ninety-eight hours to evacuate the Earth. Superman, Green Lantern, the Martian Manhunter and Wonder Woman use their powers and advanced Kryptonian technology to terraform Mars. The Martian Manhunter links Wonder Woman's mind to that of everyone on Earth so she can tell them of the coming evacuation. Superman puts every criminal on Earth into the Phantom Zone. The Flash (Wally West) and Plastic Man collect samples of every plant on Earth. Aquaman and John Stewart move most of Earth's oceans and sea life to the newly terraformed Mars. Wonder Woman talks Earth's animals into peacefully co-existing on an alien "interstellar ark" until they get to Mars. Superman and Ray Palmer use White Dwarf Star Matter to shrink fifty-eight of Earth's most important cities and place them in bottles like Kandor, including Metropolis but not Central City or Keystone City. A fleet of alien ships summoned by the Green Lantern Corps help evacuate the planet but not everyone makes it off, Batman apparently dies as the planet explodes while confronting the Red King (2) near the center of the Earth; just before he dies, Profitt apologizes for his mistake. Back on Mars, Batman returns alive with Profitt and his main accomplice; he then informs the League of what they need to do in order to stop the other Red Kings and do it before one of the other Red Kings erase their reality.

First Parallel
This attempt to take over a Parallel by the Red King (1) begins well, the plan being to be asked and allowed to rule the world rather than to take it by force. This version helps the JLA defeat a newly empowered version of the Royal Flush Gang on two separate occasions, after the second battle he is invited to become a member by Superman. Red King (1) begins to have a light romantic relationship with Wonder Woman that blooms once she learns he is Profitt (which in this Parallel was solving world hunger and had already known her for sometime). When Superman expressed some concern that Red King (1) possessed too much power for any one person, Green Lantern (John Stewart), stated that Red King (1) "probably wouldn’t even bother" working with the League if it wasn’t for Wonder Woman. The Martian Manhunter stated that he couldn’t read Red King's mind, but Red King (1) genuinely seemed to care for Wonder Woman and she trusted him, so they decided they should trust him as well. This Parallel's League soon learned of the truth behind the Red King (1) when Batman learned the comatose Doctor Destiny had been repeating his name over and over; Dee then awakened and told him the truth about the Parallels, and ultimately the JLA attacked Profitt. Red King (1) defended himself but made an effort to solve the situation without violence, (asking them to surrender) but just then the third Parallel’s Red King (3) arrived and demanded to merge with Red King (1). Red King (1) refused saying that he had changed his mind, but the other Red King (3) forced the merge regardless.

Downfall
Though he had stayed clear of the core reality, the Justice League indigenous to the Second Parallel realize its existence, the truth about their own being nothing but a facet in the Materioptikon, and the fact that the Second Parallel had to be destroyed to protect the core reality. However, to counter this, the Second Parallel Justice League retrieved their own Materioptikon from their reality's defeated Red King; using the power of the stone, they sent their reality's Plastic Man over to the other reality to communicate with their counterparts in there to do battle with that reality's Red King. This Plastic Man ended up in the First Parallel after releasing Doctor Destiny in the hub world of the Materioptikon, where he posed as a bomb similar to the one which destroyed the Earth in the Second Parallel. The Red King (3) was cornered in the JLA's base in the moon, where he was duped into believing the bomb would kill him if he could not defeat the entire Justice League in under a minute, with time to get away clear of the blast. With the Martian Manhunter manipulating his emotions, he had no escape, and was tricked by the First Parallel's League into a vortex to the core reality generated by the First Parallel's Materioptikon. That reality's Wonder Woman crushed the stone, destroying the link between the final Parallel and the Materioptikon and sealing Profitt within the core reality's Materioptikon, where Destiny's dreamself, free to roam at his leisure, prepares to torture the Red King with his now omnipotent powers, having sealed all of the gem's flaws and completing it as the true Materioptikon.

Powers and abilities
 According to JLA Classified #35 he has over 63 different metahuman abilities including electrokinesis and cryokinesis.
 Using Doctor Destiny's Materioptikon Darrin is able to create mathematically modeled parallel earths. He is able to generate a finite number of Parallels, parallel universes generated by the Materioptikon but based on his home reality. Profitt uses the parallels as elaborate mathematical models, testbeds to determine favorable outcomes for his plans. Since the Materioptikon's power comes from the absorbed dream energy of six billion humans, every use of this power diminishes the number of available Parallels that can be generated and maintained; Profitt was unaware of this until he had destroyed all but four of the Parallels.
 As the Red King he also wears a suit of high tech armor which incorporates technology solutions gathered from dozens of parallels designed to defeat individual members of the Justice League; as noted by Superman, he had the necessary strength to defeat all of them in the long term.
 As Fallback he might have had powers, but was unable to use them as another Red King killed him before he could demonstrate them.

References

External links
 DCU Guide: JLA Secret Files 2004
 Superman Homepage: JLA Classified #32

Characters created by Dan Slott
Characters created by Dan Jurgens
DC Comics supervillains
DC Comics male supervillains
DC Comics characters with superhuman strength
DC Comics metahumans
Fictional kings
Comics characters introduced in 2004